"Tu Amor" (English: Your Love) is a ballad written by British–Venezuelan singer-songwriter Jeremías, produced by Sebastián Krys and performed by Puerto Rican-American singer-songwriter Luis Fonsi. It was included as the one of two new cuts on his greatest hits package Éxitos 98:06 (2006). The song was released as a single to promote the CD. A music video was released in conjunction with the song. It became another hit for Fonsi. "Tu Amor" has peaked at number-one on Billboards Hot Latin Tracks chart.

Versions
"Tu amor" (Album version)
"Tu amor" (Salsa version)
"Tu amor" (Reggaeton version featuring Arcángel)

Charts

References

2006 singles
2006 songs
Spanish-language songs
Luis Fonsi songs
Universal Music Latino singles
2000s ballads
Pop ballads